Neil Thomson (born 27 January 1963) is an Australian politician.

At the 2021 Western Australian state election, Thomson was elected to the Western Australian Legislative Council as the only Liberal member for Mining and Pastoral.

References 

Living people
Members of the Western Australian Legislative Council
Liberal Party of Australia members of the Parliament of Western Australia
21st-century Australian politicians
1963 births
People from Ōpōtiki